José Francisco Vergara Echevers was a Chilean politician, war hero, cavalry commander, presidential candidate, engineer and journalist who was notable for founding Viña del Mar as well as his several military campaigns of the War of the Pacific.

Family
Echevers was the son of José María Vergara Albano, who was an assistant of Bernardo O'Higgins, reaching the rank of sergeant major in 1818 and later appointed mayor of Colchagua by Manuel Bulnes and Carmen Echevers y Cuevas.

He was also the grandson of José Francisco Martínez de Vergara y Rojas-Puebla, nephew of Pedro Nolasco Vergara Albano, cousin of Diego Vergara Correa, José Bonifacio Vergara Correa and uncle of the senators and deputies Ismael Valdés Vergara, Francisco Valdés Vergara and the literary critic and undersecretary of war and navy Pedro Nolasco Cruz Vergara.

He married on August 8, 1859, with Mercedes Alvares Prieto, granddaughter of Francisco Alvares and Dolores Pérez Flores. They had two children, Salvador married to Blanca Vicuña Subercaseaux; and Blanca married to Guillermo Errázuriz Urmeneta.

Studies
He completed his primary studies in private and secondary schools at the National Institute. From December, 1852 to April, 1853 he was appointed Inspector of Internal of the institute. Later he entered the University of Chile, obtaining the title of surveyor engineer in 1859 at the age of 26.

Foundation of Viña del Mar
In 1853, at the age of 20, he began to work on the train line that would link the city of Santiago and Valparaíso. During this work he met Mercedes Álvares Pérez, daughter of the owner of the Viña del Mar farm, whom he married on August 8, 1859.

On December 24, 1874, presented to the mayor of Valparaiso on the train project of the population of Viña del Mar and on 29 February 1875, the project was approved and the respective founding decree was issued. On 1875, Vergara donated the land for the construction of two schools, a chapel, a slaughterhouse and a hospital. The foundation of the city of Viña del Mar was in the lower part of the estate of the area, in which Vergara administered since the death of his in-laws in 1873.

On May 31, 1881, the decree gave rise to the Municipality of Viña del Mar, this decree was signed by President Aníbal Pinto Garmendia as he became a part of the council that elected Jose Francisco Vergara.

Political career

Deputy and Senator
In his youth, Vergara joined the Radical Party of Chile, being elected deputy on May 30, 1879.

He was a member of the Club de la Reforma and elected Grand Master of the Grand Lodge of Chile in 1881 .In 1882 to 1886 he served as senator for the province of Coquimbo representing the Radical party. In the Senate, he accused the government of Domingo Santa María of committing corruption and abuse.

Minister of State
He was Minister of War and Navy of Aníbal Pinto Garmendia and Minister of the Interior of Domingo Santa María González of whom he succeed, but the president changed his opinion due to Vergara's opinions on electoral freedom and his helped nominate future president José Manuel Balmaceda.

Severo Perpenna was the name used by Vergara for Santa Maria as he reproached his authoritarianism and political derailments, with this pseudonym, Vergara published multiple articles in the newspaper La Libertad Electoral in 1886.

War of the Pacific
Vergara was appointed by the President of Chile, Aníbal Pinto, to be secretary of the commander-in-chief of the Army, Justo Arteaga.

There were two positions that were represented, one by the Government of Pinto, at that time Minister Belisario Prats, and another by the Armed Forces, Navy and Army, represented by Admiral Juan Williams Rebolledo. The former thought that war had to be declared and on the same day, bomb the Peruvian fleet that was known to be undergoing repairs in Callao, thus leaving the road open to Lima. On second thought however, it was determined that Iquique was necessary to slow down by a blockade and then harass the people of Tarapaca, so that they could advance step by step to reach Lima in June.

Due to the head of the northern army, Justo Arteaga not accepting advice from anyone except his sons, Vergara spent his time studying the area and deducing a plan of operations. His plan was recognized by Domingo Santa María as the only reliable one. 357 He also warned Vergara to the government of lack of planning and decision making in the military command, i.e. Arteaga, what motivated the government to send Domingo Santa Maria north to analyze the situation and ensure the prompt mobilization of the Chilean Army.

Both the Minister of War, Rafael Sotomayor and his replacement, José Francisco Vergara, had to direct the course of operations considering the position of the uniformed men.

Disembarkation and capture of Pisagua

J.F. Vergara was secretary to Minister Rafael Sotomayor and after the landing he offered to lead a force of explorers that had to reconnoitre the surroundings of the only railway line that ran from Pisagua to Agua Santa. The reconnaissance found food stores, fodder, wells and water pumps and locomotives in operation that allowed the disembarked army to survive the time necessary to establish the supply by its own means. During the exploration, his detachment defeated an allied cavalry column in the Battle of Pampa Germania. For his achievements, Vergara was appointed chief of the general staff of the force of 6,000 men stationed in Dolores.

On November 19, 1879, the Battle of San Francisco took place, in which Vergara imposed his strategic criteria on that of Colonel Emilio Sotomayor Baeza, brother of the Minister. This fact prevented a catastrophe for the Chilean forces, but produced a definitive rupture, which was about to be solved with the sword, between Vergara and Sotomayor. On November 27, 1879, the Battle of Tarapacá occurred which was a disaster for the Chilean army and the subsequent request of Minister Sotomayor to Vergara to embark on Chile for the responsibility, which according to the army and public opinion, concerned him. For that matter, Gonzalo Bulnes quote from a personal page Vergara: 8

Vergara Echevers left immediately but stayed for a short time in Viña del Mar however, since according to what he tells his son Salvador, who was in Geneva, on January 26, 1880, that he is returning to the frontlines.

His view on how to conduct the war was pessimistic:

Minister of War and Navy
After the sudden death of Rafael Sotomayor Baeza during the Tacna and Arica campaign, José Francisco Vergara assumed the position of Minister of War and Navy on July 15, 1880, unleashing a wave of indignation in the Army. Manuel Baquedano wrote to President Pinto:

He participated as representative of Chile in the failed Arica Conference in October 1880, which was to end the war.

Vergara organized the expedition to Lima from Arica. He installed a dock and on the day of departure he watched each and every movement. His gaze, a mixture of pride and satisfaction, saw the launch of the boats with the food, luggage, ammunition, fodder, etc., of the 8,800 men who would define the war. Hardly any other man could have carried out the occupation of Lima without having the multifaceted personality of Vergara.

In 1881 he participated in the Battle of San Juan and Chorrillos on January 13, the Battle of Miraflores on January 15 and finally in the Occupation of Lima on January 17.

Death and legacy
Vergara returned to Viña del Mar having a hectic public life and also immersing himself in the personal care of its gardens. He died on the 15th of February, 1889 while trimming some laurels while being remembered as symbol of a glorious historical figure. He was buried in Valparaíso, in the mausoleum of his wife's family in the cemetery number 1 of Cerro Panteón.

Diego Barros Arana describes him as:

Francisco Antonio Encina describes him as:

References

Bibliography
 
 
 
 El coronel de Guardias Nacionales José Francisco Vergara, por Enrique Blanche Northcote, Memorial del Ejército de Chile, mayo-junio 1959
 Biografía Icarito
 José Francisco Vergara, análisis de sus cartas privadas y políticas
 Biografía laguerradelpacifico.cl
 José Francisco Vergara: Guerra del Pacífico y Liberalismo, Ana Henríquez Orrego, published at Valparaíso 2009

1833 births
1889 deaths
Members of the Senate of Chile
Chilean military personnel of the War of the Pacific
Candidates for President of Chile
Chilean Freemasons
Vergara family
Chilean engineers
Radical Party of Chile politicians
Chilean Ministers of the Interior
19th-century Chilean politicians